This American Life is an American television series based on the radio program of the same name. Like the radio program, the series is hosted by Ira Glass. The series premiered on March 22, 2007. Two seasons of the show have aired on Showtime. The second season finale aired on September 3, 2008, and Showtime aired one final episode in May 2009.

In September 2009, Glass announced that he and the other creators of the show had "asked to be taken off TV", largely in part to the difficult schedule required to produce a television program. He went on to state that the show is officially "on hiatus", but would like to do a television special at some point in the future. From January 10 to April 4, 2011, Current TV re-aired the series in its entirety.

Adaptation for television 
The television version of This American Life is a twofold shift in media from public radio to commercial television. The TAL staff had already attempted to move their program to television once before in 1999. Even though two different networks offered to screen a pilot, the TAL staff ultimately decided that it would be too difficult to make a television show that reflected its already successful weekly radio show. In 2002, Showtime offered to shoot a pilot, to which the TAL staff eventually agreed. In 2007, the first episode, "Reality Check", aired on television. When the staff was asked why the show moved to a commercial television station, Showtime, instead of public television (i.e., PBS), it responded that Showtime invited them to do a television show while PBS did not. This American Life still runs weekly on public radio distributed by the program's producers through Public Radio Exchange (formerly distributed by Public Radio International, which was merged into PRX in 2018).

Episodes

Season 1 (2007)

Season 2 (2008−09)

Reception

Critical reviews
Season one was well received. Giving the program four stars, People magazine said the series has an "offbeat sensibility and a reflective, compassionate intelligence," and said that the hosts "overarticulate the ironies instead of just letting you watch. Which you should do. Watch." Entertainment Weekly gave the show a B+, saying "handsomely produced experimental series ought to please flexible fans—as well as so many more who are new to the notion of an artful grab-bag documentary series about real people describing little realities." Commenting on where the program fell in "quirk" culture, Michael Hirschorn of the Atlantic said "the rhythms [of the show] are lulling, and everyone involved appears to be—is—smart, idiosyncratic, charmingly self-effacing, well-meaning," but added that "radio listeners can't really fight through Glass's scrim, so they have to take his word that the story is what he says it is. In the harsh light of television, however, the affectations of the radio show become glaringly clear."

Season two continued to get good reviews. Entertainment Weekly again gave the program a B+, saying, "Purists can rest easy, as the televised version continues to lose nothing in translation." People calls it a "superb series." The A.V. Club named the episode "John Smith" one of the top ten episodes of the decade, saying, "it successfully blends the atmosphere of the radio series with the approach of a top-notch documentary to create one of the most moving non-fiction films of the decade...It’s the kind of riveting television that you stumble upon at 1 a.m. in a motel room and can’t switch off.

Awards and nominations 
In 2007, the series won two Primetime Emmy Awards: Outstanding Nonfiction Series and Outstanding Directing for Nonfiction Programming. It was also nominated for Outstanding Cinematography for Nonfiction Programming, Outstanding Writing for Nonfiction Programming and Outstanding Editing for Nonfiction Programming.

In 2008, the series was nominated for three Primetime Emmy Awards: Outstanding Cinematography for Nonfiction Programming, Outstanding Directing for Nonfiction Programming, and Outstanding Writing for Nonfiction Programming.

Home releases 
Season one of the series was released on DVD exclusively to Borders bookstores in January 29, 2008. On May 19, 2008, Showtime announced the release would "go wide" to other retailers on September 23, 2008.

Season two was released on DVD to Borders on January 20, 2009. The set was given a wide release on July 17, 2009.

References

External links 

Showtime (TV network) original programming
TV series
Television series by CBS Studios
2007 American television series debuts
2009 American television series endings
English-language television shows
Television series based on radio series
Killer Films films